Daniel César Martín Brühl González (born 16 June 1978) is a Spanish-German actor and filmmaker. He received his first German Film Award for Best Actor for his roles in Das Weisse Rauschen (The White Sound) (2001), Nichts Bereuen (No Regrets) (2001), and Vaya con Dios (2002). His starring role in the German film Good Bye, Lenin! (2003) received widespread recognition and critical acclaim and garnered him the European Film Award for Best Actor and another German Film Award for Best Actor.

He was introduced to mainstream U.S. audiences with his breakthrough role as Fredrick Zoller, a German war hero in Quentin Tarantino's Inglourious Basterds (2009), and appeared in films like The Bourne Ultimatum (2007), The Fifth Estate (2013), and A Most Wanted Man (2014). Brühl received widespread critical acclaim and further recognition for his portrayal of former Formula 1 driver Niki Lauda in the biographical film Rush (2013) for which he earned nominations including the Golden Globe Award for Best Supporting Actor, the Critic's Choice Award for Best Supporting Actor, the Screen Actors Guild Award for Best Supporting Actor and the BAFTA Award for Best Actor in a Supporting Role.

In the Marvel Cinematic Universe, Brühl portrays Helmut Zemo in Captain America: Civil War (2016) and the Disney+ series The Falcon and the Winter Soldier (2021). He also starred as Dr. László Kreizler in the Emmy- and Golden Globe-nominated period drama television series The Alienist (2018–2020) for which he earned a nomination for the Golden Globe Award as Best Actor in a Television Motion Picture.

Brühl has worked in both European and American film productions in several languages (English, Catalan, Spanish, German, French, Polish, and Chinese) and played at least ten different nationalities, including Polish (Ladies in Lavender), Catalan (Salvador), Spanish (7 Days in Havana), French (2 Days in Paris), Hungarian (The Countess), German (Inglourious Basterds, Entebbe, and most German productions), Austrian (Rush, Woman in Gold), English (Burnt), American (The Alienist) and Sokovian (a fictional Eastern European country in Captain America: Civil War).

Early life 
Daniel César Martín Brühl González was born on 16 June 1978 in Barcelona. His father was the German TV director and documentalist Hanno Brühl, who was born in São Paulo, Brazil. His mother is Marisa González Domingo, a Spanish teacher. He was born in Spain because his mother did not trust German doctors. Shortly after his birth, the family moved to Cologne, Germany, where he grew up. He has a brother, Oliver, and a sister, Miriam. They were raised speaking Spanish, German, Catalan, and French. He attended secondary school at the Dreikönigsgymnasium, the oldest school in Cologne.

Career

1995–2002: Early work 
Brühl began acting at a young age despite not having any formal training as an actor. He participated in children's theater at school and first earned money at age 8 doing radio plays, followed by work in a dubbing studio leading to one of the dubbing actors to recommend the teenager to a talent agency. At age 15, Brühl landed a small part in the TV film Svens Geheimnis, played the street kid Benji in the soap opera Verbotene Liebe (Forbidden Love)(1995), and continued to feature in television series in the following years. In 1999, he appeared in his film debut as Checo in Paradise Mall (Schlaraffenland) and voiced Kom in the German version of Le château des singes.

In 2001, he continued to play main roles as the schizophrenic Lukas in Hans Weingartner's critically acclaimed debut film Das Weisse Rauschen (The White Sound), as Daniel in Nichts Bereuen (No Regrets), and as Marek in Honolulu. In 2002, he starred as Arbo in Vaya con Dios and as boxer Marko Stemper in Elefantenherz (Elephant Heart). He won the German Film Award (2002) for Best Actor, the Bavarian Film Award (2001) for Best New Actor, and the New Faces Award (2002) for Best Actor for his performance in Das Weisse Rauschen, Nichts Bereuen, and Vaya con Dios. He won the German Film Critics Award (2003) for Best Actor for Das Weisse Rauschen and Vaya con Dios. For Das Weisse Rauschen, Brühl insisted on meeting someone with paranoid schizophrenia to avoid the risk of making the character look clichéd. Two decades later, he still considers it his most difficult character to portray and comments that "It was important for me to explore my own madness, to believe in what I was doing and to convince myself that I was suffering from that disease, so it was quite difficult." The film has been widely cited by the academic community in discussing and understanding schizophrenia due to its realistic portrayal.

2003–2008: Breakthrough and early success 

Brühl's international breakthrough role came in 2003 as Alex Kerner in Wolfgang Becker's German tragicomedy Good Bye, Lenin! which tells about a German family that lived during the unification of Germany. The film became one of the most successful German films to date, receiving nominations at the Golden Globe Awards and the BAFTA Awards and winning at the European Film Awards, German Film Awards, Cesar Awards, and London Film Critics' Circle among others. It was sold to more than 65 countries, reaching an estimated six million cinema-goers worldwide. In that year, Brühl won awards including the European Film Awards Peoples's Choice Award for Best European Actor and the European Film Award for Best Actor for the role. He also won his second German Film Award as Best Actor for both his performance in the film and in Elefantenherz. He then voiced Kenai in the German version of Brother Bear.

Brühl reached further recognition in 2004 reuniting with filmmaker Hans Weingartner and starring as the anti-capitalist activist Jan in the internationally successful film The Edukators (Die Fetten Jahre sind vorbei). The film became a cult film as part of a "German New Wave" and received a 10-minute standing ovation at its premier at the 2004 Cannes Film Festival where it was nominated for the Palme d'Or. Brühl earned a nomination for the European Film Award for Best Actor for his role. At the same time, he won the European Film Awards Peoples's Choice Award for Best European Actor for his role as Paul in Love in Thoughts of which plot is based on the Steglitz student tragedy involving two teenagers who created a suicide club.

In the same year, Brühl made his English-speaking film debut in Ladies in Lavender, starring alongside English actresses Judi Dench and Maggie Smith as Andrea Marowski, and met Queen Elizabeth II who attended its premiere. He also played Frank in Farland. Brühl featured as Lieutenant Horstmayer of the German 93rd Infantry Regiment, a central character in the 2005 film Joyeux Noël, a trilingual World War I film based on the experiences of French, German and Scottish soldiers during the Christmas truce of 1914. The film shows Brühl's linguistic ability as he ably communicates in German, French and English throughout.

In 2006, he was invited to be part of the short film and Cinéfondation juries of the Cannes Film Festival. He starred as Chris in Cargo and Karl in A Friend of Mine, voiced Lightning McQueen in the German version of Cars and reprised his voice-over role as Kenai in the German version of Brother Bear 2. In Cannes-nominated film Salvador (Puig Antich), he played Salvador Puig Antich, a Spanish anarchist executed during the Franco era, marking his first time acting in his second language. In 2007, Brühl made a cameo appearance in 2 Days in Paris, a romantic comedy film directed by French actress Julie Delpy. He appeared in a small role as Martin Kreutz in the film The Bourne Ultimatum. In 2008, he starred in the British-Russian production In Transit, in which he played a young Nazi soldier named Klaus opposite John Malkovich. He also played Tonda in Krabat, which was based on a popular German children's story, and Marcos in A Bit of Chocolate.

2009–2015: Worldwide recognition and critical acclaim 
In 2009, Brühl starred as Dr. Georg Rosen, a notable member of the International Safety Zone Committee in Nanking, China, in the German-Chinese-French biographical film John Rabe. He was introduced to mainstream U.S. audiences in the role of Fredrick Zoller, a German war hero in Quentin Tarantino's Inglourious Basterds, starring Brad Pitt, which premiered at the 2009 Cannes Film Festival to widespread acclaim. The film won multiple awards and nominations, among them 8 Academy Award nominations including Best Picture. He and his co-stars won ensemble cast awards including the Screen Actors Guild Award for Outstanding Performance by a Cast in a Motion Picture. In May, Brühl decided to become active in a different field of filmmaking by launching the production company Fouronfilm together with Film1.

In 2010, he starred as Rupert in King's Road (Kóngavegur 7) and as Hans Krämer in The Coming Days (Die kommenden Tage). In 2011, he starred as cybernetics engineer Álex Garel employed by his former university to design robot software in Eva, a science fiction film set in the year 2041. He portrayed English teacher Konrad Koch who introduced Britain's football to his students in late 19th century Germany in Lessons of a Dream (Der ganz große Traum). He played the Oak Fairy in 2 Days in New York and starred as ethnology student Dirk whose thesis is on the aging population in All Together (Et si on vivait tous ensemble?) alongside Jane Fonda and Geraldine Chaplin. He also co-starred as Father Antonio with Clive Owen in the horror thriller Intruders. In 2012, he starred as Iván Pelayo in Winning Streak (The Pelayos) and as Leonardo in 7 Days in Havana.

In 2013, he co-starred in The Fifth Estate, a film based on the founding of WikiLeaks in which Brühl played co-founder Daniel Domscheit-Berg alongside Benedict Cumberbatch as Julian Assange. In the same year, Brühl portrayed former Formula 1 driver Niki Lauda in the Ron Howard biographical film Rush opposite Chris Hemsworth. After he was cast, he took Formula Three lessons and later more lessons with Hemsworth. He came to Vienna to meet Lauda who also flew him to the Brazilian Grand Prix to feel the racing atmosphere where he watched in the pit with the Mercedes team, putting on an earpiece to listen to conversations, and spoke to Formula 1 drivers. He had to endure seven hours of prosthetics daily during taping as his face structure was altered to take on Lauda's features. Brühl added layers that are different from Lauda to find the right balance of not just imitating the person, but also being creative. The film was a commercial and critical success. For his authentic portrayal of Lauda in terms of accent and mannerisms, he received multiple award nominations including the Golden Globe Award for Best Supporting Actor, the Critic's Choice Award for Best Supporting Actor, the Screen Actors Guild Award for Best Supporting Actor and the BAFTA Award for Best Actor in a Supporting Role.

In 2014, he starred in A Most Wanted Man as Maximilian alongside Philip Seymour Hoffman and Rachel McAdams, in The Face of an Angel as Thomas, and in the series The Trip as a patron at Terrace Bar. In 2015, Brühl was part of the Berlinale jury along with Darren Aronofsky, Audrey Tautou, and Bong Joon-ho among others. He reunited with director Wolfang Becker in one of his best performances as young writer Sebastian Zöllner in Me and Kaminski and played Austrian investigative journalist Hubertus Czernin in the biographical drama Woman in Gold alongside Helen Mirren and Ryan Reynolds. He co-starred with Emma Watson and Michael Nyqvist in Colonia. He also played maître d'hôtel Tony Balerdi in Burnt alongside Bradley Cooper. In preparation for the role, he was trained as a maître d' in Marcus Wareing's Michelin-star restaurant in London. Brühl said that since he has done the film, he has much more respect and appreciation for food, taking his time while eating and tasting, imagining the incredible effort behind it. In the same year, Brühl became a partner at Berlin- and Hamburg-based production company Amusement Park Film as a producer.

2016–present: Marvel Cinematic Universe and continued acclaim 
In 2016, Brühl starred as Escherich in Alone in Berlin, and convicted murderer Jens Söring in Killing for Love. Brühl played the Marvel comics supervillain Helmut Zemo alongside Chris Evans and Robert Downey Jr. in one of the most critically acclaimed films in the Marvel Cinematic Universe, Captain America: Civil War (2016). In Niki Caro's World War II film The Zookeeper's Wife (2017) about a married couple who saved hundreds of Jews, Brühl played Nazi zoologist Lutz Heck, who forced Jan and Antonina Żabiński to abandon the Warsaw Zoo. He starred as Ernst Schmidt in The Cloverfield Paradox, an installment in the Cloverfield franchise, and as Wilfried Böse, a founding member of the German organization Revolutionary Cells, in the action thriller Entebbe (7 Days in Entebbe) which recounts the story of Operation Entebbe.

From 2018 to 2020, he played the title role as Dr. Laszlo Kreizler in The Alienist, an American period crime drama series based on the 1994 novel by Caleb Carr, alongside Luke Evans and Dakota Fanning. In his preparation, Brühl read about famous pioneering psychologists of the time (Sigmund Freud, Josef Breuer, and Carl Jung) and went to psychotherapy in Budapest just to get an understanding of the way they worked and thought. His wife Felicitas, a practicing psychotherapist, also put him in touch with criminal psychologists. In 2019, he received nominations for the Golden Globe Award as Best Actor in a Television Motion Picture and the Satellite Award for Best Actor in a Miniseries or Television Film for his role in the series which was nominated at the Primetime Emmy Awards as Outstanding Limited Series and the Golden Globe Awards as Best Television Motion Picture. In the same year, he played fertility physician Thomas in My Zoe (2019) which was his first foray into executive production.

2021 marked Brühl's directorial debut through his dark comedy film Next Door (Nebenan), which premiered in the Berlinale Competition section at the Berlin International Film Festival as a Golden Bear nominee, wherein he also acted as Daniel, a vain and mean version of himself. The film won as Best Film and Brühl won as Best Actor in the Taormina Film Festival. He reprised his role as Helmut Zemo in the Disney+ series The Falcon and the Winter Soldier. His dancing which he improvised in The Falcon and the Winter Soldier became viral and was released in the Zemo Cut. He also starred in the Academy Award-nominated Netflix film All Quiet on the Western Front in which he played Matthias Erzberger.

Reception and acting style 

The roles Brühl takes on are often morally complex characters, men who are suffering with a deep-seated darkness that threatens to weigh down their inherent humanity. He has utilized method acting since the beginning of his career. A German and Spanish national, he has played at least nine different nationalities (Polish, Spanish, French, Hungarian, German, Austrian, British, American, and a fictional Sokovian) and in his films has spoken English, Spanish, German, French, Polish, and Chinese (comfortably in the first four mentioned). Writing for The Hollywood Reporter in 2018, Katie Kilkenny said: "If Hollywood executives have a global, and particularly European, male part to cast, there's a good chance Bruhl will make the shortlist. How did Bruhl become Hollywood's answer to a global everyman? The answer, collaborators say, lies not only in Bruhl's multilingualism, but also his choice of collaborators and Hollywood's welcoming of an influx of German talent in the last two decades." In a 2017 interview with Gentleman's Journal, Brühl attributed his success to finding his niche as an actor.

On being typecast as a villain after taking on an increasing number of antagonistic roles, Brühl said that though it was a privilege to have made Good Bye, Lenin!, it was also a "curse" because he "was always offered the part of the sympathetic nice guy" and was refreshed and relieved when offered villain roles outside of Germany. The Hollywood Insider noted his atypical career arc, "He went from consistently playing the love interest in European Cinema to playing the villain in Hollywood". Baron Zemo became one of the most iconic villains in the Marvel Cinematic Universe despite having no superpowers because of Brühl's performance. Film School Rejects remarks, "Even when embodying the role of a Nazi or another nefarious villain, Brühl manages to bring out the character's humanity — no matter how little of it there actually is". Brühl has also been described as having an "innate likability and charm". The LA Times deemed his openness as such that "even his irony sounds straightforward". He has also been lauded for his work ethic. He befriended activist Daniel Domscheit-Berg and racing driver Niki Lauda after meeting them in preparation for his roles.

Public image 
Brühl is referred to as the "golden boy of German film" and the "undisputed ruler of the European acting elite" by The Gentleman's Journal on its May/June 2017 cover. He is also regarded as the most recognizable German actor to emerge since the country's reunification. He graced the GQ Germany cover issue in December 2015 and was the recipient of the GQ Film National Award at the 2015 GQ Men of the Year Awards. He also headlined Esquire Spain, Esquire Germany, and Men's Health Best Fashion magazine, and featured in Esquire UK. He shot a Vogue and GQ Germany advert with his wife too. He became a CUPRA ambassador in December 2020, launching the CUPRA Leon e-HYBRID as the brand's first plug-in hybrid model. In May 2021, he introduced its first 100% electric model— the CUPRA Born.

In February 2017, he was honoured by the French government at the Berlin International Film Festival and awarded the Chevalier de l'Ordre des Arts et des Lettres for his 'major contribution to the influence of film culture in France, Germany, Europe and the world''', making him a Knight of the Order of Arts and Literature. He was offered membership in the Academy of Motion Picture Arts and Sciences in June 2017 to vote for the Oscars. In October 2018, Brühl accompanied Germany's Federal President Frank-Walter Steinmeier and his wife Elke Büdenbender during their visit to Spain.

 Personal life 

In 2006, Brühl separated from his longtime girlfriend and later fiancée, actress Jessica Schwarz, whom he had met on the set of the 2001 film No Regrets. Since 2010, he has been in a relationship with practising psychotherapist, academician, and former model and Broadway actress Felicitas Rombold. Their first son was born in October 2016, and they married sometime between the child's birth and early 2018. The couple had a second son in 2020.

Brühl's hobbies include running and hiking, and playing and watching tennis. His favourite player is Rafael Nadal; they are both left handed.

 Philanthropy 
Since 2017, Brühl has been campaigning for the United Nations World Food Programme, the 2020 Nobel Peace Prize winner. In 2019, he supported the "Do something for Europe!" initiative to foster solidarity in Europe and The Global Fund's Step Up The Fight initiative to end AIDS, tuberculosis, and malaria. In the same year, he campaigned for Earth Alliance's emergency Amazon Forest Fund to support partners working on the ground to protect the Amazon. In 2020, he was one of the 25 personalities to donate a personal item for the Los Fuer Lesbos (Win for Lesvos) Leave No One Behind campaign in support of refugees, donating his antique walking stick from the set of The Alienist.

 Writing 
Brühl's book Ein Tag in Barcelona (Ullstein Verlag) follows him on a one-day journey through Barcelona. His book Tapas!, co-authored with Atilano González, recreates the best dishes served at the Bar Raval'' in Berlin.

Other ventures 
Since 2011, Brühl has been the joint operator of a tapas bar named Bar Raval, located in the Kreuzberg district of Berlin. It opened during the first weekend of the 2011 Berlinale. From February to October 2017, he was joint operator of a similar bar in Prenzlauer Berg named Bar Gracia after Barcelona's nightlife district Gràcia, which closed due to lack of financial success.

Filmography

Film

Television

Filmmaking

Awards and nominations

References

External links 

 
 

1978 births
Living people
Spanish male film actors
German people of Spanish descent
German people of Brazilian descent
Spanish people of German descent
Spanish people of Brazilian descent
Male actors from Barcelona
German Film Award winners
German male film actors
European Film Award for Best Actor winners
Outstanding Performance by a Cast in a Motion Picture Screen Actors Guild Award winners
Actors from Cologne
20th-century German male actors
21st-century German male actors
20th-century Spanish male actors
21st-century Spanish male actors
German film directors
Spanish film directors
German film producers
Spanish film producers
European actors
21st-century German writers
21st-century Spanish writers
Chevaliers of the Ordre des Arts et des Lettres
Recipients of the Bambi (prize)
German male television actors
Spanish male television actors
German male voice actors
Spanish male voice actors